Starman is a name used by several different DC Comics superheroes, most prominently Ted Knight and his sons David and Jack.

Created by writer Gardner Fox and artist Jack Burnley, the original Starman, Ted Knight, first appeared in Adventure Comics #61 (April 1941). An astronomer, Knight invented a "gravity rod", later reinvented as a "cosmic rod", allowing him to fly and manipulate energy, and donned a red and green costume with a distinctive finned helmet.

Like most Golden Age heroes, Starman fell into obscurity in the 1950s. In the ensuing years, several characters, with varying degrees of relation to the original, briefly took the mantle of Starman.

In Zero Hour: Crisis in Time #1 (September 1994), writer James Robinson and artist Tony Harris introduced Jack Knight, the son of the first Starman. A reluctant non-costumed hero, he inherited his father's name and mission and used his technology to create a cosmic staff. He starred in a critically acclaimed series, written by Robinson, from 1994 until 2001.

The current successor of Starman is Stargirl, formerly the second Star-Spangled Kid.

Starman, announcing that he comes "from the past", appears in Justice League #7 (November 2018) and subsequent issues.

Below, in chronological order of activity (not of appearance), are the characters to have used the name "Starman".

Theodore Knight

Theodore Henry Knight is a 1940s DC Comics superhero who wore a red costume with a finned helmet and a green cape, and wielded a "gravity rod" (later "cosmic rod") which enabled him to fly and fire energy bolts. He is a member of the Justice Society of America.

Starman of 1951
The Starman of 1951 is a superhero who operated in the DC Universe in 1951. In pre-Crisis continuity, the Starman of the 1950s was actually Batman, who briefly took up that mantle in Detective Comics #247 (September 1957), using variants of his usual equipment, but with a star motif instead of a bat, due to him having been hypnotized to be given a fear of bats in the belief that this would render him incapable of being a hero.

Post-Crisis, the character was retconned in Starman Secret Files and Origins. The name was first used by the original Dr. Mid-Nite, Charles McNider. When David Knight, son of the original Starman, is drawn back in time, he takes over the identity from McNider for a brief period.

Star-Man
In Detective Comics #286, a villainous Star-Man appeared to menace Batman and Robin whose super-strength waned in the presence of a Tibetan belt worn by Batwoman.

Mikaal Tomas

Mikaal Tomas is an alien who traveled to Earth to help conquer it, but instead turned against his war-like people in defense of the human race. He first appeared in 1st Issue Special #12 (March 1976), and is notable as one of DC Comics' earliest openly gay superheroes.

Prince Gavyn

Prince Gavyn is a DC Comics superhero created by Paul Levitz and Steve Ditko in Adventure Comics #467 (January 1980). He is a spoiled, blond, playboy prince of an alien empire who discovered he was a mutant who could survive unaided in space.

Will Payton

Will Payton, a 1980s DC Comics superhero, was created by Roger Stern and Tom Lyle. Payton gained his powers of flight, super strength, a mild amount of shapeshifting, and the ability to alter his appearance and fire bolts of energy from his hands after being struck by a bolt of energy from a satellite in space. He was in his early twenties and worked as a magazine copy editor. He first appeared in Starman (vol. 1) #1 (October 1988).

David Knight
David Knight, a 1990s DC Comics superhero, was the son of the original Starman and elder brother of the 1990s Starman, Jack. He first appeared in Starman (vol. 1) #26 (September 1990), having taken up his father's mantle, and was killed by an assassin in Starman (vol. 2) #0 (October 1994). He regularly (annually) appeared to Jack after his death, providing guidance for his brother. Toward the end of the series, his ultimate fate was revealed to have been different from what was previously believed (as noted above for the Starman of 1951).

In Starman (vol. 2) #81 (a one-issue revival tying into the Blackest Night event), David's corpse is reanimated as a member of the Black Lantern Corps. He unsuccessfully targets Hope and Mason O'Dare, and then confronts Shade, who pulls him into the Shadowlands, imprisoning him there. During their confrontation, the Black Lantern mentions his plan to lure Jack into another "talking with David" scene before killing him, a reference to David's prior role in the series.

Jack Knight

Jack Knight, a 1990s DC Comics superhero, is the son of the original Starman, Ted Knight. He wields a cosmically powered staff, but refuses to wear a costume, instead preferring a T-shirt, leather jacket (with star emblem on the back), a Cracker Jack prize sheriff's star, and light-shielding tank goggles. A reluctant hero that took up the mantle after David died, he is the protagonist of the comic book series written by James Robinson. Jack briefly joined the JSA, but soon retired at the end of the Starman series, passing along his cosmic rod to the JSA's young heroine, Stargirl.

Thom Kallor/Danny Blaine

Danny Blaine is a DC Comics superhero of the near future whose identity (but not his full story) is revealed in the 1990s Starman series. Danny Blaine was eventually revealed to be Thom Kallor, also known as Star Boy, a DC Comics superhero in the 30th century and a member of the Legion of Super-Heroes. He originally had powers similar to Superboy, but later lost them and retained only his innate ability to increase the mass of nearby objects. Thom takes on the mantle of Starman in the 21st century with the full knowledge that he will lose his life there. The Danny Blaine/Thom Kallor version was inspired by the Kingdom Come depiction of the character, designed by Alex Ross.

One Year Later
The One Year Later line-up of the Justice Society had a new, schizophrenic Starman. Fully aware of his condition and plagued by voices and shattered impressions of his adventures through time and space, he voluntarily went to reside at the Sunshine Sanitarium in Opal City when not performing his superheroic feats, seeking a cure and protection until the JSA sent Doctor Mid-Nite and Stargirl to recruit him. He accepted, asking only a cure for his addled mind in exchange.

Hailing from the original Legion of Super-Heroes universe, where he was known as Star Boy, he received from Brainiac 5 of the Three Worlds a complete map of the Multiverse, printed on his star-clad suit, to use in a mission meant to save the entire space-time continuum. It was implied that his addled status was actually a deciding factor in his choice, since his borderline insanity was meant to prevent telepaths or skilled interrogators from gaining any information from him. However, he got stranded on Earth-22, the Kingdom Come universe, thus witnessing the dramatic events on that Earth and receiving added damage to his frail mind, worsened by the lack of the advanced medication to which he had had access in his own time.

He later decided to take the name of Danny Blaine, after his favorite pulp adventurer from Xanthu, a situation that paid off when his mental sanity was restored to him by the literal-minded Old God Gog. Unable to ensure the absolute secrecy of his mission while being Starman all the time, he accepted a job as a gravedigger in Metropolis. With Gog's defeat, Starman was returned to his disturbed state, steadily worsening due to his lack of proper medication; however, in his work as a gravedigger, he was able to locate Superboy/Kon-El's corpse and transport it to the Fortress of Solitude, where it lay under special Kryptonian crystals in a regeneration chamber for 1,000 years. The crystals recharged Conner's (Superboy) life force; thus bringing on his resurrection 1,000 years in the future as seen in Final Crisis: Legion of Three Worlds – the penultimate chapter of The Lightning Saga.

Farris Knight
The Starman of the 853rd century is Farris Knight, who is also a member of Justice Legion Alpha and was a major character in the series DC One Million. He is a distant descendant of Jack Knight and the Mist's son. Farris commands an alien artifact called a "quarvat", similar in function to the "cosmic rod". He lives on a space station (in the orbit of Uranus) from which he monitors the artificial sun Solaris. He asserts that being the descendant of the Mist as much as the Knights, he was predisposed to villainy, and Solaris eventually corrupts Farris. The man arranges for the defeat of the two JLAs and travels back in time to kill the originator of his hated responsibility, Ted Knight. Meeting Ted, however, changes his mind and Farris ultimately sacrifices himself to save the modern day Earth from Solaris' machinations, his lost quarvat apparently going on to be found by his own great-grandfather (resulting in its existence being a temporal paradox).

Victor Sono
Introduced in Jonah Hex (vol. 2) #27 (March 2008), the "Star Man" of the Old West originally came to New York City with his father from Italy just after the Civil War ended. His name was Victor Sono. His father tried to get work as a sheriff, but the group of lawmen with whom he interviewed mocked and killed him for being disabled. Young Victor later found his body hanging outside the building and decided to avenge his death. He pickpocketed a pistol and fired on the group. Before he could do much damage, however, the owner of the pistol, Jonah Hex, who was in town collecting a bounty, knocked him out and took his gun back. He nearly left the boy to the "lawmen", but after recalling his own terrible childhood, came back and rescued Victor, whom he left at an orphanage. Years later, Hex and Victor would cross paths again, Victor now calling himself the Star Man. He had dedicated his life to killing unjust lawmen and adding their sheriff's stars to his coat. The Star Man has a habit of manipulating Hex for his own ends, although he does know that he owes Hex his life.

Enemies

Each of the different incarnations of Starman has his own enemies:
 The Blockbuster II - The brother of the original Blockbuster who went through the same treatment his brother went through.
 Deadline - A mercenary who can become intangible.
 Deathbolt - A criminal who was turned into a living battery by the Ultra-Humanite.
 Doctor Phosphorus - A radioactive villain with burning skin.
 Harold Melrose - A scientist.
 The Mist - A supervillain who can turn into living vapor.
 The Power Elite - A group of six superpowered villains.
 David Winters - A member of the Power Elite who can fire radiation blasts from his eyes.
 Dennis Blake - A member of the Power Elite with energy-projecting abilities.
 Frank Donovan - A member of the Power Elite who can shoot plasma flames from his hands.
 Olivia Hardy - A member of the Power Elite with super-strength.
 Samantha Morgan - A member of the Power Elite who can change her size.
 Stanley Hale - A member of the Power Elite with flight and telekinesis.
 The Rag Doll - A contorting supervillain.
 The Spider II - The son of the original Spider.

Other versions

 Stargirl (Courtney Whitmore), formerly the second Star-Spangled Kid, is a superheroine who inherited Jack Knight's cosmic staff after he retired from being Starman. She is a member of the Justice Society of America.
 In JSA #72, a female calling herself "Starwoman" is revealed to be Patricia Lynn Dugan (the half-sister of Courtney Whitmore).
 In JLA: Age of Wonder, Starman is portrayed as a fellow inventor alongside Superman, Thomas Edison and Nikola Tesla. He invents his cosmic rod with technology gleaned from the rocket ship which brought Superman to Earth.
 In JSA: The Unholy Three, Starman is an intelligence agent working at the Chernobyl nuclear power plant and is code-named "Star".
 Dr. Stellar of Big Bang Comics has some elements of Starman.
 In JLA: Earth 2, in the Crime Syndicate's space headquarters, they have a costume belonging to a former teammate bearing the name "Spaceman". He is the Antimatter universe counterpart of Starman, although he does not make an appearance.
 Countdown: Arena introduces several alternate Starmen: an adult Courtney Whitmore from Earth-7, an intelligent gorilla from Earth-17 and a feral Mikaal Tomas from Earth-48.
 It was revealed by Ted Knight in Starman (vol. 2) #17 that Sylvester Pemberton considered calling himself Starman before he decided on Skyman.

Titles

Starman (vol. 1)

Starman (vol. 1) was a DC Comics ongoing series starring Starman (Will Payton). The series was published from October 1988 to April 1992. This Starman also appeared in a short story in Action Comics Weekly #622 released October 18, 1988.

Starman (vol. 2)

Starman (vol. 2) was an ongoing series published by DC Comics from October 1994 to August 2001, starring the superhero Starman (Jack Knight). The series was written by James Robinson with art primarily by Tony Harris from issues #0–45 and Peter Snejbjerg from issues #50–80.

Style

Starman included a number of signature thematic and stylistic elements, which helped make it distinctive. One was the importance of collectibles and collecting. James Robinson was an avid collector of a number of different things and transferred this interest to the hero, Jack Knight, who ran a collectibles shop. Many of the guest characters would also discuss their collecting interests. The book also dealt with the past and nostalgia quite frequently. One manner was through the irregular appearance of "Times Past" issues set in a different time period. These usually, but not always, focused on one of the other Starmen or the Shade. Text pieces, dubbed "The Shade's Journal" and dealing with that character's adventures over his long life, also appeared irregularly instead of a letter column. In addition, most of the characters who appeared in the book had some connection to a legacy from the past. They were either immortal, had inherited a role from a family member, or were the reincarnation of a previous hero. The book also featured a number of discussions and meditations on age. Another stylistic theme in the book was the often impressionistic approach to violence and conflict. The lead up to, and aftereffects of, violence were generally much more important in the Starman comic book than the violence itself. A number of confrontations that Jack Knight had with "villains" ended peacefully, such as an early encounter with a bounty hunter who broke into Jack's shop looking for an enchanted shirt. After a short scuffle, Jack, seeing no reason not to, agrees to sell the man the shirt. When violence was depicted, it was often much more impressionistic instead of the highly choreographed and detailed violence seen in many superhero comics. Finally, a sense of place informed many Starman stories. James Robinson has stated his appreciation for the fictional cities of the DC Universe. With Starman (vol. 2), he attempted to develop the setting of Opal City as a real place with a distinct character. Robinson and artist Tony Harris developed maps of Opal City and came up with a fictional history of it. Characters would often make mention of specific locations in the city and small bits of its history.

Story arcs

Reception
Commenting on the character and series, comic writer Geoff Johns wrote:

Awards and nominations
Starman was nominated in the 1995 Eisner Awards for "Best Continuing Series" and "Best Serialized Story" for the story arc "Sins of the Father" (issues #0–3) and won the Eisner Award for "Best Serialized Story" for the story arc "Sand and Stars" (issues #20–23). It was also nominated for "Best Continuing Series" in 1997.

Collected editions
Most of the Starman (vol. 2) series has been collected in several trade paperbacks. Uncollected issues in this series are #36, 42, 44, 46, 54 and 74, Starman 80-Page Giant #1, Starman: The Mist #1, Stars and S.T.R.I.P.E. #0, JSA: All Stars #4, The Shade #1–4 and Batman/Hellboy/Starman #1–2.

The entire Starman (vol. 2) series has been collected in six DC Omnibus hardcovers.

The entire Starman (vol. 2) series is being collected in larger Compendium editions.

In other media

 The Prince Gavyn incarnation of Starman makes non-speaking background appearances in Justice League Unlimited.
 A television series based on Jack Knight was in development, but was rendered "indefinitely on hold" in 2003.
 The Ted Knight incarnation of Starman appears in the Batman: The Brave and the Bold episode "Crisis: 22,300 Miles Above Earth!", voiced by Jeff Bennett.
 Machinima Inc. and DC Entertainment were producing a live-action web series based on an updated version of the original concept of Starman titled DC's Hero Project.
 An original incarnation of Starman, with elements of and named after Sylvester Pemberton, appears in Stargirl, portrayed by Joel McHale.

References

External links
History of Ted Knight
Starman III (Mikaal Tomas) – Gay League Profile
Starman (2016)
Starman (1941) at Don Markstein's Toonopedia. Archived from the original on October 23, 2017.
Starman (1980) at Don Markstein's Toonopedia. Archived from the original on October 23, 2017.
Starman (1988) at Don Markstein's Toonopedia. Archived from the original on October 23, 2017.
Starman (1994) at Don Markstein's Toonopedia. Archived from the original on October 23, 2u017.

Articles about multiple fictional characters
Characters created by Gardner Fox
Characters created by Paul Levitz
Characters created by Sheldon Moldoff
Characters created by Steve Ditko
Comics characters introduced in 1941
Comics characters introduced in 1957
Comics characters introduced in 1976
Comics characters introduced in 1980
Comics characters introduced in 1988
Comics characters introduced in 1990
Comics characters introduced in 1994
Comics characters introduced in 1998
Comics characters introduced in 2008
DC Comics aliens
DC Comics extraterrestrial superheroes
DC Comics male superheroes
Golden Age superheroes